The 2014–15 Ukrainian Premier League season was the 24th since its establishment. The competition commenced on 25 July when Metalurh Donetsk hosted Dnipro Dnipropetrovsk in Lviv. With the continuation of the 2014 pro-Russian conflict in Ukraine in the oblasts of Donetsk and Luhansk the Football Federation of Ukraine, the league reduced the number of teams.

Format
Initially, a new format was proposed to be introduced for this season by FC Shakhtar Donetsk. The first stage was to be a regular round robin of home/away format. In the second stage the championship was to have an additional play-off format where participants, upon completion of the regular round robin, were to be split into three groups of 4 (1–4 places), 4 (5–8 places) and 6 (9–14 places) teams. The points earned in the first stage were to be preserved. The first two groups of four teams would each have a regular round robin home/away format, while the third group of six was to play each other only once.

However, on 22 July 2014, it was confirmed that the championship would be played using a standard double round-robin tournament system. The last team would be relegated and would be replaced by the champion of the 2014–15 Ukrainian First League.

Teams
Initially, a total of 16 teams were expected to participate in the league, the best 14 sides of the 2013–14 season and two promoted clubs from the 2013–14 Ukrainian First League. The fifteenth-placed team of the 2013–14 Ukrainian Premier League, Tavriya Simferopol was relegated to the 2014–15 Ukrainian First League at the end of the season. A second team was to be relegated but with the withdrawal of Arsenal Kyiv during the 2013–14 Ukrainian Premier League season only one team was relegated.

Teams from Crimea, namely Sevastopol and Tavriya Simferopol, will not participate in the Ukrainian competition since they ceased their existences and applied (under new names) for a Russian license after the annexation of Crimea by Russia in March 2014.

The relegated team and the vacant position were to be replaced by the champions of the 2013–14 Ukrainian First League, FC Olimpik Donetsk, and the runners-up, PFC Oleksandriya. But PFC Oleksandriya refused the promotion to the Premier League and merged with FC UkrAhroKom Holovkivka.

On 2 June 2014, Premier League published two preliminary projects of possible season schedule with 16 and 12 teams respectively. On 27 June 2014, it was confirmed that 14 teams will play in the 2014–15 season.

Location map

Stadiums
The following stadiums are regarded as home grounds:

Note:

Round when attendance is noted as highest is the chronological number of the round, not the published round by the Ukrainian Premier League since some rounds were rescheduled for a later date.

Personnel and sponsorship

Managerial changes

Qualification to European competitions for 2015–16
 Since Ukraine finished in ninth place of the UEFA country ranking after the 2013–14 season, the league should have received the same number of qualifiers for 2015–16 UEFA Europa League. However, due to the recent format change, Ukraine will have only three teams entering the UEFA Europe League. The Ukrainian Cup winner qualifies for the Group stage.

Qualified teams
 After the 20th Round, Dynamo Kyiv qualified for European football for the 2015–16 season.
 After the 21st Round, both Dnipro Dnipropetrovsk and Shakhtar Donetsk qualified for European football for the 2015–16 season.
 After the 24th Round, Dynamo Kyiv qualified for the 2015–16 UEFA Champions League Group Stage after they defeated Dnipro Dnipropetrovsk.
 After the Ukrainian Cup Semi-finals, with both finalists having qualified for European football the fifth placed team will be able to qualified for 2015–16 UEFA Europa League. Zorya Luhansk can finish no worse than fifth and therefore qualify for Europa League third qualifying round.
 After the 25th Round, Vorskla Poltava qualified for the 2015–16 UEFA Europa League, entering in the third qualifying round.

League table

Results

Positions by round
The following table represents the teams position after each round in the competition.

Season statistics

Top goalscorers

Hat-tricks

Awards

Monthly awards

Season awards
The laureates of the 2014–15 UPL season were:
 Best player:  Andriy Yarmolenko (Dynamo Kyiv)
 Best coach:  Serhii Rebrov (Dynamo Kyiv)
 Best goalkeeper:  Denys Boyko (Dnipro Dnipropetrovsk)
 Best arbiter:  Yevhen Aranovsky (Kyiv)
 Best young player:  Valeriy Luchkevych (Dnipro Dnipropetrovsk)
 Best goalscorer:  Alex Teixeira (Shakhtar Donetsk)
 Fair play prize:  Zorya Luhansk

See also
2014–15 Ukrainian First League
2014–15 Ukrainian Premier League Reserves and Under 19
2014–15 Ukrainian Second League
2014–15 Ukrainian Cup
2014–15 UEFA Europa League
2014–15 UEFA Champions League

References

Ukrainian Premier League seasons
1
Ukr